John Alexander Buchanan (March 4, 1887 – May 9, 1976) was a politician and civil engineer from Alberta, Canada.

Buchanan was appointed to the Senate of Canada on January 15, 1959 on the advice of John Diefenbaker. He retired from the Senate on October 2, 1965.

Bear Creek a tributary flowing into the Peace River was formally renamed Buchanan Creek in his honor.

References

External links
 
John Alexander Buchanan biography
Alberta place names

1887 births
1976 deaths
Canadian senators from Alberta
Progressive Conservative Party of Canada senators